The Living Church is a magazine based in Milwaukee, Wisconsin, providing commentary and news on the Episcopal Church and the wider Anglican Communion. In continuous publication since 1878, it has generally been identified with the Anglo-Catholic wing of Anglicanism, and has been cited by national newspapers as a representative of that party. It absorbed a number of earlier Anglo-Catholic publications, including The American Churchman, Catholic Champion (1901), and The Angelus (1904). Theologically and culturally, it tends to have a moderate-to-conservative slant.

On June 21, 1931, the last issues of associated periodicals, The Young Churchman and The Shepherd's Arms were published.

The editor of The Living Church is Mark Michael. The periodical is a member of the Associated Church Press, a religious periodical group. Some of the magazine's content has been made available online since the late 20th century.

Editors
 Samuel Smith Harris (1878–1879)
 John Fulton (1878–1879)
 Charles Wesley Leffingwell (1879–1900)
 Frederic Cook Morehouse (1900–1932)
 Clifford Phelps Morehouse (1932–1952)
 Peter Morton Day (1952–1964)
 Carroll Eugene Simcox (January 1964 – 1977)
 H. Boone Porter (1977–1990)
 David Kalvelage (1990–2009)
 Christopher Wells (2009–2019)
 Mark Michael (2019–present)

See also 
The Anglican Digest
Linden H. Morehouse

References
 
 
Bibliography of articles by Harry Boone Porter, Jr. in The Living Church 1972-1998, compiled by Richard Mammana

External links
 
 The Layman's Magazine of the Living Church

Anglican newspapers and magazines
Anglo-Catholicism
Biweekly magazines published in the United States
Christian magazines
Magazines established in 1878
Magazines published in Wisconsin
Mass media in Milwaukee